Grand Street Settlement is a historic social service institution on the Lower East Side in New York City, United States. The institute was founded in 1916 in response to the needs of immigrants from Eastern and Southern Europe who were settling in the area. Over 10,000 individuals currently participate in Grand Street Settlement's programs.

History 

Grand Street Settlement was founded in 1916 by a group of young adults who were part of the Stevenson Club at Madison House (the present Hamilton-Madison House). The group perceived a need in the Lower East Side's immigrant communities for smaller settlement houses, and concluded that this would help these communities achieve self-sufficiency. With the help of philanthropist Rose Gruening they opened the Arnold Toynbee House (named after the British social reformer, Arnold Toynbee) in a brownstone building at 257 Division Street. It was renamed Grand Street Settlement eight years later.

In the 1920s and 1930s, the Settlement's main services were provided through clubs for children and young men and women. These clubs featured art, sewing, and dance. The settlement also operated household management and child-rearing programs for parents, and a kindergarten for their children.

In 1925, Camp Moodna in Orange County, New York, was donated to Grand Street as a respite location for working girls who needed a break from the summer heat. The camp would give way to summer day camps for both boys and girls in later years.

By the 1930s, the agency had expanded its services, and professionals began replacing volunteers on staff. Core programs in the late 1930s and during the 1940s included childcare, daycare, and health and personal services.

Beginning in the 1950s and 1960s, and continuing to the present, the Lower East Side has seen the arrival of new immigrants, mostly from the Caribbean, Latin America, and Asia.

Programs 
Today, Grand Street Settlement focuses on four primary program areas: early childhood, children and youth, adults, and senior citizens. More than 10,000 community members are involved annually in the agency's participant-driven programs.

Grand Street Settlement's early childhood programs currently serve over 400 children, through Early Head Start, Head Start, and Day Care programs for children up to the age of six.

Youth and adolescents are served through programs such as Attendance Improvement and Dropout Prevention, Girls’ and Young Women's Initiative, Boys’ and Young Men's Initiative, the College and Career Discovery Center, and Project COOL (Creative Opportunities for Outstanding Learners). The Summer Day Camp is also a long-standing Grand Street Settlement event and provides youth with an array of educational and recreational activities for seven weeks each summer. In addition, Grand Street Settlement is a partner with the Americorps program, has an active Intel Computer Clubhouse, and provides in-service training for 40 volunteers

Programs for adults and families consist of counseling and support services, including a Single Stop Center, which offers benefits screening and on-site tax assistance, and financial and legal help; and a Community Technology Center, which is available to the entire community.

Programs for seniors assist low-income and home-bound senior residents of the Lower East Side. Services include nutritional, educational and recreational activities as well as a Senior Housing project which offers apartments and supportive services to older adults.

References

External links 

 Grandstreet.org
 Americorps.org

New York (state) society
Organizations established in 1916
Settlement houses in New York City